Benjamin Becker was the defending champion, however he chose to compete in Rome instead.
Dudi Sela defeated Rainer Schüttler in the final. He defeated him 7–6(3), 6–3.

Seeds

Draw

Finals

Top half

Bottom half

References
Main Draw
Qualifying Draw

Ixian Grand Aegean Tennis Cup - Singles
Ixian Grand Aegean Tennis Cup